Bertachar (or Berthachar) was a king of Thuringia from about 510 until about 525, co-ruling with his brothers Hermanfrid and Baderic.

Bertachar was probably not a Thuringian himself. Frankish sources, such as Venantius Fortunatus, make the three brothers sons of King Bisinus. They are sometimes considered as sons of Bisinus' wife Menia, or else as sons of Basina, who is called a wife of Bisinus by the Frankish historian Gregory of Tours. Many scholars, however, reject Bisinus' marriage to Basina as ahistorical, leaving Menia as his only known wife.

Bertachar's rule probably began between 507 and 511. He was murdered by his brother Hermanfrid, who later murdered Baderic to become sole ruler of Thuringia. This assassination may have taken place as early as 525.

Bertachar had at least one daughter and, depending on the source, one or several sons. His sons are unnamed. His daughter, Radegund, married the Frankish king Chlothar I and founded Holy Cross Abbey in Poitiers. She is revered as a saint in the Catholic Church. Two hagiographies of her were produced by her friends Baudovinia and Venantius Fortunatus. Fortunatus specifies that she was "from the Thuringian region", a daughter of King Bertachar and a granddaughter of King Bisinus.

Notes

Sources
Primary sources

Venantius Honoricus Clementianus Fortunatus, Vita Sanctae Radegundis, ed. Bruno Krusch. MGH SS rer. Merov. 2 (Hanover, 1888), 364–377.

Secondary sources

Kings of the Thuringians
6th-century rulers in Europe